Tapinoma luffae is a species of ant in the genus Tapinoma. Described by Kurian in 1955, the species is endemic to Indonesia.

References

Tapinoma
Hymenoptera of Asia
Insects described in 1955